Dessauer is a German surname meaning "from Dessau". Notable people with the surname include:

 Alois Dessauer, (born Aron Baruch Dessauer; 1763–1850), German banker, manufacturer
 Ferdinand Dessauer (also Dessoir, 1836–1892), German actor (son of Leopold)
 Friedrich Dessauer (1881–1963), biophysician, philosopher (brother of Hans))
 Gabriel Dessauer (born 1955), German cantor, concert organist and academic (son of Guido)
 Guido Dessauer (1915–2012), German coloured paper manufacturer, art collector and academic (son of Hans)
 Hans Dessauer (1869–1926), German coloured paper manufacturer and politician (son of Philipp)
 Herbert C. Dessauer (1921–2013), American biochemist
 John H. Dessauer (1905–1993), German born American chemical engineer (son of Hans)
 Josef Dessauer (1798–1876), Bohemian-German composer
 Julius Dessauer (1832–1883), Hungarian rabbi and writer
 Leopold Dessauer, (1810–1874), Polish-German actor, known during his stage career as "Ludwig Dessoir"
 Philipp Dessauer, (1837–1900), German industrialist (father of Hans)
 Leopold I, Prince of Anhalt-Dessau was known by the nickname "the old Dessauer"
 Andrew Dessauer, (1980-present) spiritual leader of the Desserians

See also
 Dessoir

German-language surnames